The Frontline Club is a media club and registered charity located near Paddington Station in London. With a strong emphasis on conflict reporting, it aims to champion independent journalism, provide an effective platform from which to support diversity and professionalism in the media, promote safe practice, and encourage both freedom of the press and freedom of expression worldwide.

Since opening its doors in 2003, Frontline Club has hosted over 1,200 events. Its founders do not receive wages and the events programme is almost self-sustaining, mainly from membership fees and ticket income.

Discussions, held most weekday evenings, are broadcast live. Past participants include John Simpson, Robert Fisk, Jeremy Paxman, Tim Hetherington, Nick Robinson, David Aaronovitch, Alan Rusbridger, Jeremy Bowen, Louis Theroux, Gillian Tett, Christina Lamb, Julian Assange, Jon Lee Anderson the late Benazir Bhutto, the late Boris Berezovsky, the late Alexander Litvinenko, and his widow, Marina Litvinenko.

The club includes a restaurant open to non-members, a club room, meeting rooms, two lodging rooms and a discussion forum as well as an annex with 12 bedrooms available to members The club also hosts film and documentary screenings and organises training and workshops in such skills as camera operation and film editing.

In May 2011, broadcaster Louis Theroux said in an interview with the Evening Standard that the Frontline Club was his favourite London club.

History

The Frontline Club opened in 2003. It was founded by surviving members of Frontline News TV, a cooperative of freelance cameramen formed during the chaos of the Romanian revolution in 1989.

It specialized in war reporting for television. Vaughan Smith, one of two surviving founders of Frontline News TV, turned the operation into a club, offering a meeting place for those who believe in independent journalism, as well as to honour dead colleagues. It also aims to lobby for better support for the freelance journalistic community.

The clubroom has a display of relics drawn from the history of war reporting since the Crimean war. Cabinets show personal items, some with shell still embedded, that have stopped a bullet and saved a journalist's life. The walls of the Frontline Club display examples of war photography and artwork.

In December 2010 Vaughan Smith, the owner of the Frontline Club, offered Julian Assange of WikiLeaks his private home in Suffolk as an address for bail. Assange had been staying at the club for two months.

In 2019 the club launched Frontline Freelance Register for freelance journalists and reporters operating in war zones to help them with issues related to welfare, digital security and insurance. The register states on their website "The Frontline Freelance Register" (FFR) is open to international freelance journalists who are exposed to risk in their work and who adhere to our Code of Conduct. We aim to provide our members with representation and a sense of community."

References

External links

 
 Frontline Club social network
 
  New York Times on the Frontline Club
 Frontline Club restaurant Giles Coren's review in The Times

Charities based in London
Clubs and societies in London
Press clubs
United Kingdom journalism organisations